Jonathan James Newell (born 30 September 1978) is a former English cricketer.  Newell was a right-handed batsman who bowled right-arm off break.  He was born at Crawley, Sussex.

Newell represented the Sussex Cricket Board in a single List A match against Hertfordshire in the 1999 NatWest Trophy.

In 2005, he joined Buckinghamshire.  He made his debut in the Minor Counties Championship against Staffordshire. From 2005 to 2007, he represented the county in 15 Championship matches, the last of which came against Hertfordshire.  Newell also represented the county in the MCCA Knockout Trophy, where he played 3 matches for the county between 2005 and 2006 against Wiltshire, Cambridgeshire and Hertfordshire.

Family
His brother Mark played first-class cricket for Sussex and Derbyshire, as well as List A cricket for the Sussex Cricket Board.  Additionally, he also represented Buckinghamshire in Minor Counties cricket.  His other brother Keith played first-class cricket for Sussex, Matabeleland and Glamorgan.  He also played List A cricket for Wales Minor Counties.

References

External links
Jonathan Newell at Cricinfo
Jonathan Newell at CricketArchive

1978 births
Living people
Sportspeople from Crawley
English cricketers
Sussex Cricket Board cricketers
Buckinghamshire cricketers